Kailashganj Union is a union of Dacope Upazila in Khulna District of Bangladesh.

Geography
Kailashganj Union has an area of 7214 acres (29.18 sq km).

References

Unions of Dacope Upazila
Populated places in Khulna Division
Populated places in Khulna District